Metallic paint, also called metal flake or polychromatic, is a type of paint that is most common on new automobiles, but is also used for other purposes.  Metallic paint can reveal the contours of bodywork more than non-metallic, or "solid" paint. Close-up, the small metal flakes included in the paint create a sparkling effect mimicking a metal surface.

Description
Metallic paints, or just metallics, generally consist of a base coat with a clear "lacquer", usually a transparent acrylic polyurethane top coat, for protection and extra gloss.

"Flop", or "flip-flop", refers to the difference between the amount or hue of light reflected at different angles from a metallic paint surface.  The differences are caused by the size and reflectivity of the flakes in the paint, and also by their orientation and the degree to which they are all oriented in the same direction.  Historically, it was difficult to achieve an invisible repair if the paint was damaged because it is critical to reproduce the flop of the original surface as well as its pigment.  Modern techniques have more or less eliminated this problem.

Variations
Metallic paints may be generically referred to as metal-flake paint, but a specific variation uses larger flakes of metal that are individually visible.  Flakes with different colour effects may also be used within the same paint.

Pearlescent paint uses embedded pieces of iridescent material to produce subtly different colours depending on the angle and intensity of the light.  More radical colour changes and "two-tone" or "flip" colours (e.g. from purple to orange) are sometimes produced.  Two-tone paints such as ChromaFlair have been used by Nissan on some special parts, and are frequently associated with TVR cars.

Metallic paint is sometimes described as polychromatic paint, although sometimes only two paints showing strong colour-changing effects.  This is distinct from polychrome decoration, which is a traditional decoration in multiple flat colours.

"Candy apple" or "flamboyant" paint consists of a metallic base coat, usually silver or gold, covered with a translucent coloured lacquer, or more commonly urethane. It gives an unusual effect of depth, but is almost impossible to touch up after damage without leaving an obvious mark. It is hardly ever used on automobiles but common on bikes, motorcycles and electric guitars. 

Hammer paint dries in a pattern that looks like hammered metal. It is more commonly used on machinery.

Expense
Luxury car manufacturers (particularly German marques such as BMW and Mercedes-Benz) almost always charge a premium for the "option" of metallic paint on a new vehicle. This is often considered a captive market as metallic paints usually account for all but one or two of the colors from the palette available (only red, black, and white are available as solid colors from many brands). Buyers may choose to pay it, in some cases merely to maintain resale value.

The price premium for metallic paint is GBP 500 or USD 1000 for a large car, while pearlescent paint (such as White Diamond Pearl) is even more expensive. For BMW Canada and BMW North America, the metallic paint premium applies to entry-level offerings such as the BMW 3 Series (resulting in a disproportionate number of 3 Series cars sold in the late 2000s being white) and the BMW X1, while more expensive cars such as the BMW 5 Series have metallic paint as a no-charge option.

Given that having a car subsequently resprayed in a metallic color is no more expensive than for a solid color, many consider the price premium for metallic paint as a way to boost the base price of a luxury car. Japanese luxury marques and many mass market brands usually do not charge extra for metallic paint.

See also
Kinechromatic art
Luminous paint
Metallic colour

References

Paints